The large-scale grass lizard (Chamaesaura macrolepis), also known as the large-scaled snake lizard, Zambian grass lizard, or Zambian snake lizard, is a species of lizard in the genus Chamaesaura. It lives scattered across southern Africa with two subspecies.

Distributation
The large-scale grass lizard lives in grasslands in South Africa, Eswatini, Tanzania, Zambia, Angola, and the Democratic Republic of the Congo.

Subspecies
The large-scale grass lizard has two subspecies.

 C. m. macrolepis - This subspecies was discovered by Cope in 1862.
 C. m. miopropus - In 1894, George Albert Boulenger discovered a second subspecies.

Footnotes

Chamaesaura
Reptiles described in 1862
Taxa named by Edward Drinker Cope
Reptiles of South Africa
Reptiles of Eswatini
Reptiles of Tanzania
Reptiles of Zambia
Reptiles of Angola
Reptiles of the Democratic Republic of the Congo
Lizards of Africa